Invisible Design is the eighth solo album by the American composer Bill Laswell, released on March 23, 1999, by Tzadik Records.

Track listing

Personnel 
Adapted from the Invisible Design liner notes.
Musicians
Bill Laswell – bass guitar, drum programming, effects, producer
Technical personnel
Ikue Mori – design
Robert Musso – engineering
Allan Tucker – mastering

Release history

References

External links 
 

1999 albums
Bill Laswell albums
Albums produced by Bill Laswell
Tzadik Records albums